Eurig Wyn (10 October 1944 – 25 June 2019) was a Welsh politician and reporter. He was a Plaid Cymru Member of the European Parliament for Wales from 1999 to 2004, when he lost his seat, in part due to a reduction of the number of seats allocated to Wales.

He had previously been a journalist for the BBC. During 2005, Eurig Wyn was selected as Plaid Cymru's parliamentary candidate for the Ynys Môn constituency which he unsuccessfully sought to gain for Plaid Cymru in the general election of that year.

He died in June 2019.

See also
Jillian Evans MEP (Plaid Cymru)

References

External links
Profile at European Parliament website

1944 births
2019 deaths
Welsh-speaking journalists
Welsh-speaking politicians
Plaid Cymru parliamentary candidates
Welsh journalists
Plaid Cymru MEPs
MEPs for Wales 1999–2004